March Of The Lonely is the third studio album by British musician Martin Grech, released on 4 June 2007.

Track listing
"Treasures" – 1:41
"Kingdom" – 3:39
"The Heritage" – 4:03
"Ashes Over Embers" – 5:41
"The Washing Hands" – 4:32
"Soul Sirens" – 5:22
"Ruins" – 3:46
"The Giving Hands" – 4:04
"All Lovers Learn"  – 4:36
"Heiress" - 2:28
"March Of The Lonely" - 5:56

References

2007 albums
Martin Grech albums